Drimia indica is a species of flowering plant found from South Asia to South Africa.

Description

Drimia indica is a perennial herbaceous flowering plant which grows from bulbs. It has long leaves, typically 15–30 cm long by 1–2.5 cm wide, but sometimes considerably longer. The flowers, which appear in spring before the leaves, are borne in racemes on a leafless stem (scape) up to 60 cm long. The flowers are widely spaced on the raceme, which is 15–31 cm long, and are carried on stalks (pedicels) 2.5–4 cm long. Individual flowers are bell-shaped. The six pale brown tepals have white margins. The 6–7 cm long stamens have yellow anthers and filaments which are flattened at the base. Between six and nine seeds are produced in a capsule which is 1.5–1.8 cm long. Individual seeds are black and shaped like flattened ellipsoids.

Distribution

D. indica has a wide distribution, in tropical and southern Africa, the Indian subcontinent and eastwards to Vietnam.

Uses

D. indica is used as a substitute for the "true squill", Drimia maritima, in traditional medicine.

Sources

External links
https://archive.today/20130216224731/http://www.tribalmedicine-hemadriz.com/papersnreviews.html
 

Scilloideae
Flora of Asia
Flora of Africa